The following is a timeline of the history of the city of Buffalo, New York, United States.

Prior to 18th century 

 1620 - Erie Nation occupies area
 1651 - Seneca Nation destroys Erie Nation
 1679 - La Salle built Fort Conti and launched Le Griffon.
 1687 - Marquis de Denonville built Fort Denonville at the mouth of the river.

18th century 

 1784 - Area known as the Buffalo Creek region.
 1793 - Holland Land Purchase is completed

19th century

1800s-1860s 
 1801 - Buffalo is founded by Joseph Ellicott. 
 1810 - Population: 1,508.
 1811 - Buffalo Gazette newspaper begins publication.
 1813 - December 30: Battle of Buffalo fought during the War of 1812.
 1816 - Village incorporated in Niagara County.
 1818 - Walk-in-the-Water Great Lakes passenger steamboat begins operating. It was named after Walk-in-the-Water a Huron chief.
 1820 - Population: 2,095. 
 1821 - Buffalo designated seat of newly created Erie County.
 1825 - Erie Canal opens.
 1830 - Population: 8,668.
 1832
 City of Buffalo incorporated.
 Ebenezer Johnson served as the first Mayor. 
 1833 - Lake Shore and Michigan Southern Railway established.
 1834 - Cholera.
 1835 - November 11: "Cyclone" occurs.
 1836
 Young Men's Association active.
 Buffalo Library (social library) organized.
 1840 - Population: 18,213.
 1842 - Joseph Dart invented the Dart's Elevator, a steam-powered grain elevator. 
 1846 - University of Buffalo and its Medical School established.
 1847 - Roman Catholic Diocese of Buffalo established.
 1848 - June: 1848 Free Soil Party national convention held in Buffalo; Martin Van Buren nominated as U.S. presidential candidate.
 1849 - Forest Lawn Cemetery established.
 1850 - Population: 42,261.
 1851
 St. Paul's Cathedral built.
 Buffalo Seminary founded.
 1853 - New York Central Railroad in operation.
 1854 - YMCA U.S. branch organized in Buffalo.
 1856
 Chippewa Market opens.
 Manufacturers and Traders Bank in business.
 1858 - Broadway Arsenal opened. 
 1860 - Population: 81,129.
 1861
 Buffalo Society of Natural Sciences founded.
 St. Joseph's Collegiate Institute founded.
 1862 - Buffalo Historical Society formed.
 1863 - St. Joseph Cathedral consecrated.

1870s-1890s

 1870
 Richardson Olmsted Complex built.
 Roman Catholic (Jesuit) Canisius College founded.
 Population: 117,714.
 1871 - Buffalo Normal School founded, became "State Normal and Training School"
 1873
 Church of St. Stanislaus, Bishop and Martyr established.
 International Railway Bridge to Canada opens.
 Buffalo Sunday Morning News begins publication.
 1874 - "The number of ships built at Buffalo was thirty-seven."
 1875
 County and City Hall constructed.
 Population: 134,238. 
 1876
 Delaware Park–Front Park System developed.
 Delaware Avenue Methodist Episcopal Church built.
 1880 - Population: 155,134.
 1881 - Architect Louise Blanchard Bethune in business.
 1882 - Grover Cleveland becomes mayor.
 1886
 Westinghouse AC electrical power station begins operating.
 University of Buffalo School of Pharmacy established.
 1887 - University at Buffalo Law School established.
 1890 - Population: 255,664.
 1892 - University of Buffalo School of Dental Medicine established.
 1893
 Buffalo and Susquehanna Railroad in operation.
 Former mayor Grover Cleveland becomes U.S. president.
 1894 - Twentieth Century Club founded.
 1896 - Ellicott Square Building completed.
 1899 - Labor strike of grain workers.
 1900
 Manufacture of Thomas Auto-Bi motorcycle begins.
 Population: 352,387.

20th century

 1901
 May 1: Pan-American Exposition opens in Delaware Park.
 September 6: Assassination of William McKinley, U.S. president.
 September 14: Inauguration of Theodore Roosevelt as U.S. president.
 September 23–24: Trial of assassin Leon Czolgosz held.
 1902 - YMCA Central Building built.
 1905 - Albright Art Gallery (of modern art) opens.
 1908
 D'Youville College founded. 
 Hotel Statler in business (first in chain).
 1910 - Population: 423,715.
 1914 - Art Theater in business.
 1917 - December 9: Snowstorm.
 1919
 The new Erie Canal was rebuilt as a barge canal.
 Rivoli Theatre in business.
 1920
 University at Buffalo raised an endowment of $5m. by popular subscription.
 Population: 506,775.
 1921 - Loew's State Theatre in business.
 1922 - WGR radio begins broadcasting.
 1923 - On February 24, Phi Omega chapter of the National Omega Psi Phi fraternity was chartered at University of New York at Buffalo as first African American Greek-Lettered Fraternity established in western New York.
 1924
 DuPont cellophane manufactory begins operating.
 WEBR radio begins broadcasting.
 1926
 Buffalo Courier-Express newspaper in publication (ceased 1982).
 Buffalo Niagara International Airport, then known as "Buffalo Municipal Airport", opens in nearby Cheektowaga
 Shea's Performing Arts Center opens.
 1927 - Peace Bridge to Canada opens.
 1929 - Buffalo Museum of Science and Buffalo Central Terminal open to public.
 1932 - Buffalo City Hall built.
 1936 - Coin-operated Launder-Ur-Own laundromat in business.
 1940 - Buffalo Memorial Auditorium opened
 1948 - WBEN-TV (television) begins broadcasting.
 1950 - Population: 580,132.
 1954 - WGR-TV (television) begins broadcasting.
 1960 - Buffalo Bills Football Inaugural Season. Team is second professional team with the name and the third professional football franchise in the city.
 1966
 January: Blizzard.
 Theodore Roosevelt Inaugural National Historic Site established.
 1967 - Race riot occurs in East Buffalo as part of Long, hot summer of 1967
 1970 
 Buffalo Sabres Hockey Inaugural Season
 Buffalo Braves Basketball Inaugural Season. Team plays 8 seasons in Buffalo before relocating to San Diego and later Los Angeles to become the Los Angeles Clippers
 1971
 February 22: Blizzard.
 Erie Community College Buffalo campus established.
 1977 - January: Blizzard of '77.
 1979
 Buffalo and Erie County Naval & Military Park established.
 Amtrak closes Buffalo Central Terminal, redirecting passenger rail service to the Exchange Street and Depew stations
 1984 - 
Buffalo Metro Rail begins service
Republic Steel shutters South Buffalo mill
 1988 - Sahlen Field (then known as "Pilot Field") opens, replacing War Memorial Stadium
 1989 - Western New York Documentary Heritage Program headquartered in Buffalo.
 1990 - Population: 328,123.
 1996
KeyBank Center (then named Marine Midland Center) opens, replacing the Buffalo Memorial Auditorium 
City website online (approximate date).

21st century

 2000 - Population: 292,648
 2001
 Buffalo Niagara Medical Campus established 
 December: Snowstorm.
 2005
 Byron Brown becomes mayor.
 Brian Higgins becomes U.S. representative for New York's 27th congressional district.
 2006 - October 13: Lake Storm "Aphid"
 2008 - Canalside, then named Erie Canal Harbor, reopens to public after early phase of redevelopment work.
 2010 - Population: 261,310.
 2014 - November 17–20: "Snowvember" snowstorm.
 2017 - Tesla, Inc. opens Giga New York solar panel factory on old Republic Steel site
 2020
 Population: 278,349, Buffalo finally gains population again after 70 years.
 Buffalo police shoving incident occurs as part of George Floyd protests
2022 
 May 14: The deadliest shooting in the city's 221-year history occurs. 13 people are shot, and 10 of them die.
 December 23 - 27: A snowstorm kills 41 people, becoming the deadliest snowstorm in the city's history. 
 2023 
 Mayor Byron Brown begins his historical 5th term as the City's mayor.
 A magnitude 3.8 earthquake affects the Buffalo area in February.

See also
 History of Buffalo, New York
 List of mayors of Buffalo, New York
 National Register of Historic Places listings in Buffalo, New York
 Timelines of other cities in New York state: New York City (also Bronx, Brooklyn, Queens); Saratoga Springs

References

Bibliography

External links

  (Includes atlases, city directories, etc.)
 
 Items related to Buffalo, New York, various dates (via Digital Public Library of America)
 

Buffalo
Years in New York (state)